Our Friends, the Hayseeds is a 1917 Australian rural comedy from director Beaumont Smith. It centers on the rural family, the Hayseeds, and their rivalry with a neighbouring family, the Duggans.

It was Smith's first movie as a director and was a popular success at the box office, leading to a number of sequels. However no known copy of it exists today and it is considered a lost film.

Synopsis
The Hayseeds and Duggaans live on selections next to each other. Joe Hayseed and Pansy Duggan want to get married but their families quarrel when the Hayseeds' cow gets into the Duggan's corn and they are forbidden to see each other. The two families have a brawl on the bush fence, a fight that only ends in exhaustion. However, a bush fire unites them and Jim and Pansy marry. Pansy falls pregnant and Dad Hayseed and Dad Duggan both hope for a boy which will be named after them. She ends up giving birth to twin girls.

The film was divided into four sections: the first two dealing with a day in the life of the Hayseeds; the last two under the title "Pansy's Wooing" with Joe and Pansy's courtship. A contemporary reviewer said that of the film's 5,000 foot length, 1,000 feet was dedicated to humorous titles.

Cast
 Roy Redgrave as Dad Hayseed
 Walter Cornock as Joe Hayseed
 Pearl Hellmrich as Pansy Duggan
 Margaret Gordon as Mrs. Hayseed
 J. Plumpton Wilson as Parson
 H.H. Wallace as Dan Hayseed
 Vera Spaull as Poppy Hayseed
 Cecil Haines as Lizzy Hayseed
 Jack Radford as Tommy Hayseed
 Peter Ward as Peter Hayseed
 Tom Cannam as hired hand
 Percy Mackay as Mr Duggan
 Nan Taylor as Mrs Duggan
 Crosbie Ward as Mike Duggan
 Fred Carlton as Jack Dugggan
 Olga Agnew as Mollie Duggan
 Gerald Kay Souper as parliamentarian
 Esther Mitchell as his wife

Production
The movie was inspired by the success of Bert Bailey's stage adaptation of Steele Rudd's Dad and Dave stories, On Our Selection and Philip Lytton's play The Waybacks.  Smith had worked with Bailey and Edmund Duggan on the initial production of Selection.

Shooting took place on location in South Australia in Campbelltown and Norwood. Many of the cast had appeared in Beaumont Smith's theatrical productions of While the Billy Boils (which he filmed in 1921) and Seven Little Australians.

While shooting the bushfire scene off the side of a hill at Campbelltown, the fire got out of control and momentarily trapped the actors. According to contemporary press reports, "they came out of that fire black as coal heavers, almost blind with smoke, and singed badly. Their faces were a study of horror and fear, and that heartless photographer turned the handle all the time. But he got a most realistic picture."

Reception
The movie's local appeal was heavily advertised to South Australian audiences in publicity. The Adelaide Mail said of the film that "the tone was pleasing, and made an undeniably good impression on those who witnessed it... the film is splendidly put together. It contains but little plot, most of the scenes presenting incidents of everyday life. Some of the scenes, however, are a little drawn-out, particularly the fight between the Hayseed and Duggan families."

Box office response was strong and there were a number of sequels starting with The Hayseeds Come to Sydney. It was the first feature from theatrical entrepreneur Beaumont Smith who went on to become one of Australia's most prolific filmmakers of the silent era.

See also
The Hayseeds Come to Sydney (1917)
The Hayseeds' Back-blocks Show (1917)
The Hayseeds' Melbourne Cup (1918)
Townies and Hayseeds (1923)
Prehistoric Hayseeds (1923)
The Hayseeds (1933)

References

External links

Our Friends, the Hayseeds at National Film and Sound Archive

1917 films
Australian silent feature films
Films directed by Beaumont Smith
Lost Australian films
Australian black-and-white films
Australian comedy films
1917 comedy films
1917 lost films
Lost comedy films
Silent comedy films